Miedo Escenico is the first solo studio album by the Chilean singer and ex-member of the Chilean rock band La Ley, Beto Cuevas. The album was released in Latin America on 23 September 2008, and in the United States on 30 September 2008 by Warner Brothers.

History
This is Beto Cuevas' first solo album, post-La Ley. La Ley was a successful, Grammy-winning Chilean/Latin American band that Cuevas fronted from 1988 until 2005.
To promote the album, Cuevas, along with his band consisting of musicians Ben Edwards, Lawrence Kats (Mighty Mighty Bosstones), Steve Tushar (Fear Factory) and Brendan Buckley (Shakira), initially toured several venues throughout the United States, followed by a small promotional tour in Argentina and Chile. The song "Vuelvo" was the first single to be launched from the record.

The album was produced by Steve Tushar and Aureo Baqueiro and Beto Cuevas. Beto was also involved in several other aspects of the production, including song-writing, designing of the album artwork and directing the music video for the song Vuelvo.

Track listing
Standard Edition
"Miedo Escenico"
"Vuelvo"
"Un Minuto De Silencio"
"Háblame"
"Are You Sorry?"
"El Cínico"
"No Me Queda Nada"
"Algo"
"Tú y Yo"
"La Historia Que Nunca Vamos a Contar"
"Mi Única Verdad"
"Mañana"

Release history

Charts

References

External links
The Official Beto Cuevas Site
The Official Beto Cuevas site on My Space

2008 debut albums
Warner Records albums